The 1955–56 Hapoel Petah Tikva season was the club's 21st season since its establishment in 1935, and 8th since the establishment of the State of Israel.

At the start of the season, the league which started during the previous season was completed, with the club finishing 1st, winning its first ever championship. The new league season, with the top division being re-named Liga Leumit, began on 3 December 1955 and was completed on 3 June 1956, with the club finishing as runners-up.

During the season, the club also competed in the State Cup, which was also carried over the summer break. The club eliminated Beitar Tel Aviv and Hapoel Ramat Gan to reach the cup final against Hapoel Petah Tikva. Maccabi Tel Aviv won the match 3–1 and won its 8th State Cup.

Match Results

Legend

International friendly matches
During the season Hapoel Petah Tikva played two international friendly matches, drawing one and winning the other.

In February 1956 the Israeli government lifted the ban on hosting teams from Austria and Hapoel and Maccabi Petah Tikva invited Kapfenberger SV to a tour of Israel. The visit was met with criticism from right-wing politicians and acts of sabotage in order to stop the Austrian team from playing, but the matches went ahead as planned.

1954–55 Liga Alef
The league began on 6 February 1955, and by the time the previous season ended, only 20 rounds of matches were completed, with the final 6 rounds being played during September and October 1955.

Final table

Matches

Results by match

1955–56 Liga Leumit

Final table

Matches

Results by match

State Cup

Shapira Cup
In October and November, while the promotion playoffs and the State Cup were being played, two cup competitions were organized by Liga Leumit Clubs, the second edition of the Shapira Cup, and the Netanya 25th Anniversary Cup. Maccabi Haifa, Hapoel Petah Tikva, Hapoel Tel Aviv and Maccabi Tel Aviv played for the Shapira Cup, named after former Hapoel Tel Aviv treasurer Yosef Shapira. The competition was designed to be played as a double round-robin tournament but the competition was delayed after the teams playing only two matches each, as the third round matches were postponed due to weather conditions and then due to the 1954–55 Israel State Cup final, which involved Maccabi Tel Aviv and Hapoel Petah Tikva. As league matches started on 3 December 1955, the competition was abandoned altogether.

Table

References

Hapoel Petah Tikva F.C. seasons
Hapoel Petah Tikva